Mutya ng Pilipinas 2013, is the 45th edition of Mutya ng Pilipinas, Inc., that was held on 26 July 2013, at the NBC Tent, Taguig. Andrea Koreen Medina of Quezon City, Mutya ng Pilipinas Asia Pacific International 2013 and Angeli Dione Gomez of Cebu City, Mutya ng Pilipinas Tourism International 2013 emerged victorious at the end of the proceedings.

Results
Color keys

Special Title

Special Awards

Special Award

The 31 Official Contestants

References

External links
 Official Mutya ng Pilipinas website
 Mutya ng Pilipinas 2013 is on!
 Mutya ng Pilipinas on Facebook

2013
Mutya ng Pilipinas
2013 in the Philippines